Slobbery Jim (real name unknown) was a leader of the 1850s New York City gang, the Daybreak Boys, which was formed in the late 1840s in Five Points slum with membership drawn from teenaged Irish immigrants. The gang committed robberies, ship sabotage, and frequent murders along the East River. The Daybreak Boys are believed to have caused the loss of at least $100,000 in property and committed at least twenty murders between 1850 and 1852. 

Jim assumed leadership of the gang with Bill Lowrie in 1853 after three of the gang's leaders were arrested after a failed attempt to raid the brig William Watson. However, he had to flee New York City to avoid prosecution for the murder of a fellow Daybreak Boy known as "Patsy the Barber". The two had robbed and murdered a newly arrived German immigrant but then the pair got into an altercation at a criminal dive known as the "Hole-in-the-Wall" over the distribution of the twelve cents taken from the victim. Slobbery Jim wanted the lion's share as he had thrown the man into the river while Patsy the Barber wanted an equal share as he had bludgeoned the victim in the first place. Slobbery Jim tried to bite Patsy the Barber's nose off while Patsy the Barber tried to cut Jim's throat. After a lengthy fight, Jim cut Patsy's throat before stomping him to death with his hobnail boots.

References
 Herbert Asbury, The Gangs of New York: an Informal History of the Underworld. Wheeler Publishing, Waterville, Maine 2003  especially pages 46–47 (originally written in 1927, this book was the basis of the Martin Scorsese film, Gangs of New York)
 Michael and Ariane Batterbury, On the Town in New York: The Landmark History of Eating, Drinking and Entertainments. Routledge: U.K. (1998), p. 106 (referring to the fight with Patsy the Barber)

External links
This information page on traditional music contains information on the Hole-in-the-Wall including the fight with Patsy the Barber

1853 in New York (state)
Gang members of New York City
19th-century American criminals
Year of birth missing
Year of death missing
Place of death missing
1853 murders in the United States